A horse show is a judged exhibition of horses and ponies. Many different horse breeds and equestrian disciplines hold competitions worldwide, from local to the international levels.  Most horse shows run from one to three days, sometimes longer for major, all-breed events or national and international championships in a given discipline or breed. Most shows consist of a series of different performances, called classes, wherein a group of horses with similar training or characteristics compete against one another for awards and, often, prize money.

International organizations and competitions

There are ten international disciplines run under rules established by the Fédération équestre internationale (FEI):

Combined driving
Dressage
Endurance riding
Eventing
Paraequestrianism (Paralympic equestrian sport for athletes with disabilities)
Reining
Show jumping
Tent pegging
Vaulting
Western Pleasure
Showmanship

The rules of the FEI govern competitions open to riders from all nations, including the Olympic games and the World Equestrian Games.

At the other end of the competition spectrum, Pony Club is an international movement that teaches young people riding skills suitable for eventing and other English riding competition.  To help develop positive experience and good sportsmanship, Pony Clubs also sponsor horse shows open only to young people under the age of 18 and their horses. Various nations also have their own programs for developing young equestrians, such as the 4-H program in the United States.

Horse shows within various nations

Australia
Horse shows in Australia are governed by Equestrian Australia, Show Horse Council of Australia and different breed societies. Much of the development of the show horse (also referred to as saddle horse) discipline was developed over the last 40 years by Fran Cleland through her involvement with the Equestrian Federation of Australia's (EFA) Victorian branch (now known as EV). Fran Cleland is the wife of Reg Cleland who was the longest serving Chairman of the Victorian branch of the EFA which was in turn responsible for running The Barastoc Horse of The Year Show the premier horse Show in Australia for over 40 years and under the direction of Fran Cleland introduced Newcomer, Show-hunter, leading rein, first ridden, owner rider and working Hunter classes into the Australian Show Horse scene.

Canada
The governing body for Equestrian activities in Canada is Equine Canada (EC).

United Kingdom
In the United Kingdom there is a distinct difference between "horse competitions" such as dressage or eventing and horse shows. Horse shows provide an opportunity for riders and owners to exhibit their animals without taking part in any of the Olympic disciplines. Classes are divided into ridden and in-hand sections and there are many different classes for different horses and ponies. For example, there are classes for Mountain and moorland pony breeds, show hunters, show hacks, equitation, and various show pony classes. Many clubs hold riding club classes, where a horse or pony must perform a short "show" (solo performance) and jump a single fence that varies in height from 2 feet to 3 feet 3 inches. Most shows also include show jumping and working hunter sections.

The British Horse Society oversees many shows at national, regional and local level as does the Pony Club, the British Show Pony Society and the British Show Horse Association. Breed societies, particularly those that look after the Welsh pony and the Arabian horse also organise their own shows. At local, unaffiliated level, riding clubs across Britain organise regular shows, which are often staffed by volunteers. The newly formed Showing Council is working towards officially overseeing all horse shows (non-FEI disciplines).

The Olympic equestrian disciplines are overseen by the British Equestrian Federation. However, there are several subdivisions within the federation. Dressage competitions are held separately from regular horse shows, and are overseen by British Dressage. Show jumping competitions are overseen by the British Showjumping Association (BSJA), while one-day and three-day eventing are overseen by British Eventing.

United States
The United States Equestrian Federation is the American national body for equestrian sport and as such is also the recognized entity overseeing the Olympic-level United States Equestrian Team.  It also organizes and sponsors horse shows for many horse breeds who wish to utilize the drug testing, judge certification and standardize rulemaking process of the USEF.  In addition, it sanctions events in disciplines and lower-level competitive areas that are not internationally recognized,  such as show hunter and equitation.  Other US organizations such as the National Cutting Horse Association , United States Eventing Association (USEA) and United States Dressage Federation (USDF) organize competitions for specific disciplines, such as Cutting, and some breed organizations such as the American Quarter Horse Association sanction their own breed-specific shows.

Horse shows in the United States take several forms: Some are restricted to a particular breed, others are "open" or "all-breed" horse shows, which offer both classes open to all breeds as well as breed-specific classes for many different breeds.  In the last few decades, American "open" horse shows have tended to become specialized by discipline into hunter-jumper or "sport horse" shows, dressage shows,  and shows featuring English or Western riding events.   However, there are still some multi-day, all-breed events that feature multiple breeds and disciplines.

Structure

There are a range of competitive equestrian events available and specific offerings range widely by nation and even by region within a given country.  However, in North America, most horse shows provide the following range of classes:

The English riding classes fall into two primary styles, hunt seat and saddle seat. "Hunt type" or sport horse classes include dressage, show jumping and show hunters, Eventing (also called horse trials), and English pleasure or Hunter Under Saddle, also known as a "flat" class, where the event is judged on presentation, manners and rideability of the horse). "Saddle seat" or "Saddle type" classes are all on the flat and are mostly variations on English Pleasure, though the high action "Park" style classes differ because they emphasize brilliant trotting action.  Equitation classes judge the form and ability of the rider.

Show jumping, eventing and dressage are sometimes called "Olympic" events, because they are the equestrian sports included in the Olympic Games.

Western or stock horse competition includes working cattle events, such as cutting, team penning and working cow horse in the USA, and campdrafting in Australia.  They also include "dry" classes (without cattle) that include western pleasure, reining and equitation.

There are also specialized classes for draft horse showing, and a number of events for horses and ponies driven in harness, including Fine Harness classes for Saddle Seat-type horses, Roadster classes that use equipment similar to that of harness racing,  and the FEI-sanctioned sport of combined driving.  Miniature horses also have their own shows, with a number of specialized classes.

Most horse shows offer Halter classes, also called "breeding," "conformation," or "In-hand" classes.  In these classes the horse is led without a saddle, not ridden, and its conformation and gaits are judged.  To train young equestrians in halter showing techniques, horse showmanship classes (also called Showmanship in hand or youth showmanship), are offered.  They are the halter equivalent of equitation, in that the handler, not the horse, is judged on his or her abilities.

Classes may be broken down by the age of horse or rider, by the number of first place ribbons earned by horse or rider, and by size or breed of horse (or pony).  In addition, there is a near-infinite range of regional or specialty classes that may be offered.  Various types of costume classes are frequently offered; sidesaddle classes are common; a "leadline" or "walk-trot" division may be offered for small children or very inexperienced riders; and assorted "freestyle" classes, where a horse and rider perform a routine set to music, are also popular.

Rodeos and horse pulling competitions are not technically horse shows, but they are competitive equestrian events, often with a great deal of prize money. Equestrian vaulting is not usually seen at ordinary horse shows, even though it is an FEI-recognized equestrian sport. Games, such as Gymkhana or O-Mok-See competition are usually held separately from ordinary horse shows, though a few of these "speed" events may be thrown in as "fun classes," particularly at 4-H, Pony Club, and other small shows.

Awards

Prize money is sometimes awarded, particularly at larger competitions. The sum varies by the placing of the rider, the prestige of the show, and the difficulty of the class.  Horse Shows do not offer cash purses as large as those the Thoroughbred racing industry, though a few of the biggest show jumping, cutting and reining competitions may offer purse money into the low five figures. However, most show horses in the United States, especially those at the amateur levels, rarely win significant cash prizes during their show career.  At best, a solid competitor might break even on entry fees and, if they are quite lucky, cover some travel expenses.  Most money made from showing horses is indirectly earned by breeding fees paid for top horses, the sale of their offspring, or from the training fees paid to top trainers.

Trophies are usually awarded to the first place horse in a class, depending on the size of the show.  In a championship event, trophies may be awarded to both the champion and the reserve champion, and at a national or international show, trophies are sometimes given to the top five to ten competitors.

Medals are given at international events such as the World Equestrian Games and the Olympics.  Usually only three medals, Gold, Silver, and Bronze, are awarded to the top three individuals or teams.

Ribbons are often given for the top placings in a class.  Often ribbons are given through the top six place entries, although some of the larger shows may award ribbons to the top ten. Ribbon color varies from country to country, as shown in the following chart:

Champion & Reserve Champion ribbons are commonly called Tri-colors.  They are usually a combination of the 1st, 2nd, & 3rd place colors for Champion and 2nd, 3rd, & 4th for Reserve Champion.

See also
Agricultural show
Equestrian at the Summer Olympics
Equestrian drill team
Equestrian Federation of Australia
Equestrianism
Equitation
Horse show steward
International Federation for Equestrian Sports (FEI)
Ringmaster (horse show)
Show (animal)
United States Equestrian Federation (USEF)

Horse show sanctioning organizations
British Show Horse Association
Equestrian Australia
Equine Canada
Federation Equestre International (FEI)
United States Equestrian Federation

Equestrian sports
Horse showing and exhibition
Animal shows